Benedikt Danek (born 24 August 1986) is an Austrian professional basketball player for the Klosterneuburg Dukes of the Austrian Basketball Superliga.

He represented the Austria national team during the 2019 FIBA World Cup qualifiers.

References

External links
 Real GM profile
 Eurobasket.com profile

1986 births
Living people
Austrian men's basketball players
Point guards
Sportspeople from Vienna
Xion Dukes Klosterneuburg players
Traiskirchen Lions players